Picket Fence Cartel is the seventh studio album by Project 86. It was released on July 14, 2009 through Tooth & Nail Records.

The sound for the album has been described as "heavier", as Andrew Schwab mentioned on a MySpace blog that fans who favor the "heavy" sound will be pleased. The album was also released on 12" vinyl through Tooth & Nail Records.  Only 500 copies of the LP were pressed and released. The "Picket Fence Cartel" LP is considered a major collector's item and was the first of the band's albums to be released on vinyl.

The album allegedly featured Randy Torres on guitars and piano, however Torres stated that he did not play on the record. The drummer of the album is also uncredited on the release.

Track listing

Personnel
Andrew Schwab – vocals
Steven Dail – guitars, bass

References

2009 albums
Project 86 albums
Tooth & Nail Records albums
Albums produced by Ulrich Wild